Oliver Grainger (born May 9, 1988) is a Canadian former child voice actor.

Grainger is the voice actor for Dongwa, Sagwa's older brother, on Sagwa, the Chinese Siamese Cat.

He also is the voice actor of D.W. Read on Arthur between Season 4 and Season 6, replacing Michael Caloz, and George Jamell on Mona the Vampire.

He has appeared on shows including What's with Andy?, Daft Planet, Upstairs, Downstairs Bears, Flatmania and For Better or For Worse.

Oliver decided to quit his acting career in 2005 to do some fishing. He revealed on his Facebook posts that he's still in contact with his Arthur castmate Justin Bradley, who is the second voice actor of Arthur Read.

Filmography
 Arthur as Dora Winifred "D.W." Read (1999–2001)
 Sagwa, the Chinese Siamese Cat as Dongwa Miao (2001–2002)
 Mona the Vampire as George Jamell (1999–2002)
 Tommy & Oscar as Peter (2000-2002)
 Daft Planet as Hudson Stiles (2002)
 For Better or For Worse as Various characters
 What's with Andy? as Bryan
 Flatmania as Vincent
 Upstairs, Downstairs Bears as Henry

References

External links
 
Arthur's Perfect Christmas Review at variety.com

1988 births
Canadian male voice actors
Canadian male child actors
Living people
People from Dorval